Brazos Point is a ghost town in Bosque County, in the U.S. state of Texas.

History
Charles Walker Smith and Tom Willingham founded Brazos Point when they built a store, a cotton gin, and a mill along the banks of the Brazos River. A post office was established at Brazos Point in 1873 and remained in operation until 1896. The community was also home to Brazos Point Community Church. It had a steam-powered cotton gin, a gristmill, a general store, and a physician supporting 200 residents in the mid-1880s. It plunged to 75 in 1896 and moved to Farm to Market Road 56 for better business opportunities. Its population was 50 from 1933 to 1947 but seemingly disappeared soon after.

Geography

Education
Brazos Point had its own school in 1860. Today, Brazos Point is located within the Kopperl Independent School District.

References

Ghost towns in Texas